The Unbreakable Tour is the third concert tour by Tori Kelly, in support of her debut studio album Unbreakable Smile (2015). The tour began in San Diego, California at Humphreys Concerts By the Bay on April 5, 2016, and concluded its 37-city run on May 7, 2017, in Memphis, Tennessee at the Tom Lee Park.

Background and development 
On January 12, 2016, Tori Kelly announced her debut album would be re-released on January 29, 2016 with new songs "Hollow" and "Something Beautiful". In honor of the re-release, she also announced she would be embarking on her second tour for the album (previously embarking on her Where I Belong Tour in 2015).

Set list 
This set list is representative of the show on April 6, 2016 in Tempe, Arizona. It is not representative of all concerts for the duration of the tour.

"Where I Belong"
"Unbreakable Smile"
"Expensive"
"Anyway"
"Nobody Love"
"Falling Slow"
"First Heartbreak" / "Art of Letting You Go" / "Paper Hearts"
"Daydream"
"Beautiful Things"
"Suit & Tie" / "P.Y.T. (Pretty Young Thing)" / "Thinkin Bout You"
"Confetti"
"Funny"
"I Was Made for Loving You"
"City Dove"
"Talk"
"Something Beautiful"
"All in My Head" / "Dear No One"

Encore
"Hollow"
"Should've Been Us"

Shows 

Festivals and other miscellaneous performances
This concert is a part of the All-Star Concert Series Part of the Pepsi Music Series
This concert is a part of the Braves Summer Concert Series presented by Coca-Cola and Delta Air Lines
This concert is a part of SunFest
This concert is a part of the Beale Street Music Festival

References 

2016 concert tours